Shelley's greenbul (Arizelocichla masukuensis) or Shelley's bulbul, is a species of the bulbul family of passerine birds. It is found in east-central Africa. Its natural habitats are subtropical or tropical dry forests and subtropical or tropical moist montane forests.

Taxonomy and systematics
Shelley's greenbul was originally described in the genus Andropadus and re-classified in the new genus Arizelocichla in 2010. Alternatively, some authorities classify Shelley's greenbul in the genus Pycnonotus. Also, some authorities consider the Kakamega greenbul to be a subspecies of Shelley's greenbul. The common name, 'Shelley's greenbul', is also used as an alternate name for the placid greenbul.

Subspecies
Two subspecies are recognized:
 Wilhelmstal mountain greenbul (A. m. roehli) - (Reichenow, 1905): Also named the Masuku mountain greenbul. Found in north-eastern, central and southern Tanzania
 Nandi mountain greenbul (A. m. masukuensis) - (Shelley, 1897): Found in south-western Tanzania and northern Malawi

References

External links
Image at ADW

Shelley's greenbul
Birds of Sub-Saharan Africa
Birds of East Africa
Shelley's greenbul
Shelley's greenbul
Taxonomy articles created by Polbot